Opinion polling for the 2002 Czech legislative election started immediately after the 1998 legislative election.

Opinion polls

References

2002